Alexis Irénée du Pont (February 14, 1816 – August 23, 1857) was an American business executive who ran the Eleutherian Mills gunpowder factory in Delaware. He was fatally injured along with five of his employees in an accidental explosion at the powder mills. He was the youngest child of Éleuthère Irénée du Pont, founder of E. I. du Pont de Nemours & Company.

Life and career 
Born in New Castle County, Delaware, Alexis Irénée du Pont attended Mount Airy College in Germantown, Pennsylvania, and the New Haven Gymnasium in Connecticut from 1829 to 1831. Classmates included his nephew, James Irénée Bidermann, the only child of his father's business partner, Jacques Antoine Bidermann, and his sister, Evelina Gabrielle du Pont. Alexis Irénée completed scientific studies at the University of Pennsylvania from 1831 to 1835, though he never received his degree.

In December 1836, he married Joanna Maria Smith (1815–1876), daughter of Philadelphia merchant Francis Gurney Smith and sister of physician Thomas Mackie Smith, who had recently married Alexis Irénée's sister, Eleuthera du Pont Smith. Alexis Irénée and Joanna had eight children, including Francis Gurney du Pont, Eugène du Pont, and Alexis Irénée du Pont Jr.

Alexis Irénée du Pont became a partner in E. I. du Pont de Nemours & Company in 1837 and continued in this capacity until his death on August 23, 1857, having been fatally injured in an explosion at the powder mills a day earlier.

References 

1816 births
1857 deaths
Alexis Irénée
People from New Castle County, Delaware
University of Pennsylvania alumni
19th-century American businesspeople
American business executives
Deaths from explosion